Augustin Poignet was the politician from Republic of the Congo who served as President of Senate of the Republic of the Congo.

Personal life 
He was born in 28 April 1928 and died in 26 June 2008 in Paris. He also served as interim president of Congo in 1968 for one day and became Minister of Defense after that.

References 

1928 births
2008 deaths

Presidents of the Senate (Republic of the Congo)